Arganaceras ("Argana horn") is a medium-sized pareiasaur from the Late Permian Ikakern Formation of Morocco.

References 

Pareiasaurs
Lopingian reptiles of Africa
Fossils of Morocco
Fossil taxa described in 2005
Prehistoric reptile genera